"Call Me Mañana" is a song by German group Scooter. It was released in January 1999 as the third and final single from the 1998 album No Time to Chill. The melodic theme of the track is a sample from L.A. Style's 1991 single "James Brown Is Dead".

Track listing
CD Single
"Call Me Mañana" [Heavy Horses Radio] (3:40)
"Call Me Mañana" [Heavy Horses Extended] (5:36)
"Bramfeld" (5:16)

12"
"Call Me Mañana" [Heavy Horses Radio] (3:40)
"Bramfeld" (5:16)
"Call Me Mañana" [Heavy Horses Extended] (5:36)

Chart performance

Certifications

References

Scooter (band) songs
1999 singles
1998 songs
Songs written by H.P. Baxxter
Songs written by Rick J. Jordan
Songs written by Jens Thele